I Was Born to Love You may refer to:
I Was Born to Love You (song), a 1985 song by Freddie Mercury, a re-worked version was released by Queen in 1995
I Was Born to Love You (album), a 2000 album by Eric Carmen